Abbasabad-e Seh Choqa (also Romanized as ‘Abbāsābād-e Seh Choqā) is a village in Chaqa Narges Rural District, Mahidasht District, Kermanshah County, Kermanshah Province, Iran. At the 2006 census, its population was 155, in 39 families.

References 

Populated places in Kermanshah County